Harold Lloyd (1893–1971) was an American film actor and producer

Harold or Harry Lloyd may also refer to:

 Harold Lloyd Jr. (1931-1971), American actor and singer, son of Harold Lloyd
 Harold Lloyd (footballer) (1920–1984), Welsh footballer
 Harry Lloyd (born 1983), English actor
 Harry Lloyd (footballer) (1899–1976), Australian footballer
 Harry Lloyd (rugby union) (born 1995), Australian rugby union player
 Harry J. Lloyd (1926–1997), American businessman and real estate developer
 Harold Lloyd Murphy (1927-2022), American judge